Gurinder Singh Sandhu (born 14 June 1993) is an Australian international cricketer who plays for Queensland domestically. Of Indian descent, he is a tall fast bowler. He played for the Australia Under-19 cricket team in the 2012 ICC Under-19 Cricket World Cup. Sandhu made his senior cricket debut for the Sydney Thunder in the 2011–12 Big Bash League season. He made his List A and First-class cricket debut for New South Wales at the end of the 2012–2013 Australian cricket season.

Sandhu, born in Blacktown, New South Wales, is the first male cricketer of Indian descent to represent Australia in an international tournament. His parents emigrated to Australia in the 1980s. In March 2013, Sandhu was voted the Australian Cricketers' Association player of the month.

It was announced on 26 April 2018 that Sandhu had signed for Tasmania for the upcoming season, ending a five-year stint with New South Wales.

Domestic career

Sandhu played three games for New South Wales in the 2017–18 JLT One-Day Cup, taking 5 wickets but conceding 6.13 runs per over. His best performance of the tournament came against Western Australia, when he took 4 wickets for 57 runs in a 9-run loss.

International career

He made his senior international debut for Australia in a One Day International against India at the Melbourne Cricket Ground in January 2015. He had limited success in the series and played no further games for Australia.

Notes

References

External links
 
 

Living people
1993 births
Australian cricketers
Australia One Day International cricketers
Cricketers from Sydney
Sydney Thunder cricketers
New South Wales cricketers
Australian people of Indian Punjabi descent
Delhi Capitals cricketers
Tasmania cricketers
Sydney Sixers cricketers